Yvon Mougel (born 25 May 1955) is a French biathlete. He competed at the 1976 Winter Olympics, the 1980 Winter Olympics and the 1984 Winter Olympics.

References

1955 births
Living people
French male biathletes
Olympic biathletes of France
Biathletes at the 1976 Winter Olympics
Biathletes at the 1980 Winter Olympics
Biathletes at the 1984 Winter Olympics
Sportspeople from Vosges (department)